The Coffee County Courthouse is a historic county courthouse in Courthouse Square in Elba, Alabama, one of two county seats of Coffee County, Alabama.  It was added to the National Register of Historic Places on May 8, 1973. It is located at 230 Court Avenue. Elba is subject to frequent floods of the Pea River; high water marks on the courthouse walls indicate the highest level reached in past floods.

Coffee County also has a courthouse in Enterprise that was built in 1998. The Elba courthouse serves the western portion of the county.

See also
National Register of Historic Places listings in Alabama
List of county courthouses in Alabama

References

National Register of Historic Places in Coffee County, Alabama
Romanesque Revival architecture in Alabama
Government buildings completed in 1903
Buildings and structures in Coffee County, Alabama
County courthouses in Alabama
Courthouses on the National Register of Historic Places in Alabama